The shriketits are a group of three species of birds in the genus Falcunculus endemic to Australia where they inhabit open eucalypt forest and woodland.

Taxonomy and distribution

Species
Three species are recognized, with disjunct ranges:

 Northern shriketit (F. whitei), or White's shrike-tit - Campbell, AJ, 1910: Originally described as a separate species. It is found in the Kimberley region of north-western Australia and the Top End of the Northern Territory
 Western shriketit (F. leucogaster), or white-bellied shrike-tit - Gould, 1838: sparsely distributed in south-western Western Australia
 Eastern shriketit (F. frontatus) - (Latham, 1801): is in south-eastern Australia from the Lower South-East of South Australia, coastally and in the Murray-Darling Basin to south-eastern Queensland, with some scattered occurrences further north and west in Queensland

Description
Males are larger than females in wing length, weight, and bill-size. Males have black throats, while females have olive green throats, and both sexes have bold black and white markings on the face.

Behaviour

They feed mainly on insects, spiders and, sometimes, particularly during the breeding season, young birds. Thistle seeds are also taken. They have a parrot-like bill, used for distinctive bark-stripping behaviour, which gains them access to invertebrates. The bird is unobtrusive, and the sound of the bark strips being torn off trees provides an indication of their presence. They nest high in a eucalyptus tree, in a fork of a branch, both sexes sharing the incubation and the rearing of the young. There may be two broods.

References

General sources 
 
 Dickinson, E. C. 2003. The Howard & Moore Complete Checklist of the Birds of the World. 3rd Ed. Princeton, N.J.: Princeton University Press,
 Schodde, R. and I. J. Mason. 1999. Directory of Australian Birds. Volume 1: Passerines. CSIRO Publishing, Canberra.

 
Endemic birds of Australia
Birds of New South Wales
Birds of Queensland
Birds of South Australia
Birds of Victoria (Australia)
Taxa named by Louis Jean Pierre Vieillot